The Honourable Company of Master Mariners is one of the Livery Companies of the City of London. While the other Livery Companies are entitled to the style Worshipful, the Master Mariners are styled Honourable, King George V having granted them that honour in 1928.

The Company aids nautical schools and promotes nautical research. Members meet regularly to socalise, discuss technical issues and assist with the mentoring and training of young officers, who will train at sea to reach Master mariner status.

The Honourable Company ranks seventy-eighth in the order of precedence for Livery Companies. Its motto is Loyalty and Service. The organisation nominally has the right to allow two of its Masters to serve as nautical assessors in the Admiralty Court.

The company works with other industry organisations such as the International Federation of Shipmasters' Associations. This includes the organisations of lectures and command seminars.

History
The Company was formed and incorporated in 1926. In February 1928, His Royal Highness, Edward, Prince of Wales was elected Master of the Company. The company was made an official Livery Company by the City of London in 1932, making it the first new Livery Company to be formed since 1746.

In February 1952 Her Majesty Queen Elizabeth II became royal patron of the Company. In June 1954, His Royal Highness Prince Philip, Duke of Edinburgh was made a Master of the company.

From 2005 to 2007, Her Royal Highness Anne, Princess Royal served as Master of the Company.

HQS Wellington

Instead of the usual livery hall, the Honourable Company of Master Mariners has a headquarters ship, HQS Wellington, moored on the Thames at Victoria Embankment. The Company purchased the ship from the Admiralty in 1947 following donations from their members. She was subsequently converted for use as a floating livery hall in Chatham Dockyard. The conversion was paid for by donations from Lloyd's of London, private benefactors, shipping companies and other livery companies. In December 1948, the ship was moved to her permanent mooring along the Victoria Embankment. In 1991, the ship was extensively refurbished following a period of dry-docking in the private yards at Sheerness Dockyard. In July 2005, ownership of HQS Wellington was transferred from the Honourable Company to a new organisation, the Wellington Trust, although the company retains its home onboard and is largely responsible for leadership within the trust.

On display on the ship is the steering wheel of the ship 'Otago', the Master Joseph Conrad having sailed on the 'Otago' and following her destruction in 1931, the wheel was presented to the Honourable Company.

References

External links
 The Master Mariners' Company
 The Marine Society

Mariners
1926 establishments in England